Berambang Island is an island at the southern bank of the Brunei River in the Mukim Kota Batu, Brunei-Muara District, Brunei. The island was formerly named Buang Tawer during The Brooke Era from 1841 until 1941. The mausoleum of the 9th Sultan of Brunei, Sultan Muhammad Hassan is located on the island, near Kampong Sungai Bunga.

A proposal for an  protection status to be implemented on the island. The island is home to proboscis monkeys, birds, secondary forests and swamp forests.

Geography 
Berambang, Baru-Baru and Berbunut are the three islands which are located in close proximity of Bandar Seri Begawan. Cape Kindana (Tanjong Kindana) is located at the most north eastern end of the island. It is also the longest island in Brunei Bay and the biggest in the Brunei River.

History 
During Sultan Hassan's reign from 1582 until 1598, he was the architect of the bridge linking from Tanjong Kindana or also known as Tanjong Chendana, to Cermin Island. It can be noted that after the death of Sultan Hassan in 1598, he was buried near Sungai Bunga in Cape Kindana.

In 1903, a Charles Brooke's coal mine discovered oil on the island. According to an annual report in 1915, a blockhouse overlooking the river built during the coal mining days was dismantled and materials were reused to build a new office, police station and barracks in Muara.

In the 1990s, a proposal was made to create a  mangrove forest reserve. As part of the 2001-2005 Eighth National Development Plan (RKN), a B$181.5 million housing scheme was drawn up in several areas which included Kampong Sungai Bunga. In 2007, a new cemetery was built on the island.

Population 
As of 2016, the island comprised the following census villages:

Majority of the buildings are built from concrete, especially on the northern side of the island.

References 

Islands of Brunei
Protected areas of Brunei